The Integrated Ocean Drilling Program (IODP) was an international marine research program, running from 2003 to 2013. The program used heavy drilling equipment mounted aboard ships to monitor and sample sub-seafloor environments. With this research, the IODP documented environmental change, Earth processes and effects, the biosphere, solid earth cycles, and geodynamics.

The program began a new 10-year phase with the International Ocean Discovery Program, from the end of 2013.

Navigating the route to discovery 

Scientific ocean drilling represented the longest running and most successful international collaboration among the Earth sciences. Scientific ocean drilling began in 1961 with the first sample of oceanic crust recovered aboard the CUSS 1, a modified U.S. Navy barge. American author John Steinbeck, also an amateur oceanographer, documented Project Mohole for LIFE Magazine.

Legacy programs 
The Deep Sea Drilling Project (DSDP), established in June 1966, operated the Glomar Challenger in drilling and coring operations in the Atlantic, Pacific, and Indian Oceans, as well as in the Mediterranean and Red Seas. The Challenger’s coring operations enabled DSDP to provide the next intellectual step in verifying the hypothesis of plate tectonics associated with seafloor spreading, by dating basal sediments on transects away from the Mid-Atlantic Ridge.

This required the use of sonar scanning equipment and a large-scale re-entry cone.

Process-oriented Earth studies continued from 1985 until 2003 aboard the JOIDES Resolution, which replaced the Glomar Challenger in January 1985 as DSDP morphed into the Ocean Drilling Program (ODP). The JOIDES Resolution is named for the 200-year-old HMS Resolution which explored the Pacific Ocean and Antarctica under the command of Captain James Cook.

The Ocean Drilling Program contributed significantly to increased scientific understanding of Earth history, climate change, plate tectonics, natural resources, and geohazards. ODP discoveries included validation of:
 fluids circulating through the ocean floor;
 the formation of gigantic volcanic plateaus at phenomenal rates unknown today;
 natural methane frozen deep within marine sediments as gas hydrate;
 a microbial community living deep within oceanic crust;
 climate change cycles

IODP funding agencies 
National consortia and government funding agencies supported IODP science and drilling platform operations.
Participation in IODP was proportional to investment in the program.

Contributing member 
The European Consortium for Ocean Research Drilling (ECORD) was established in December 2003 with 13 European countries to represent the European contribution in IODP. The consortium grew into a collaborative group of 17 European nations (Austria, Belgium, Denmark, Finland, France, Germany, Iceland, Ireland, Italy, The Netherlands, Norway, Poland, Portugal, Spain, Sweden, Switzerland and The United Kingdom) and Canada that together comprise an IODP-funding agency. Working alongside Japan and the United States, ECORD provided the IODP scientific community with access to mission-specific platforms, which chosen to fulfill specific scientific objectives. These platforms have limited space on board for labs and scientists, and require an onshore science meeting to describe, process, and analyze the sediment samples collected immediately following a drilling expedition.

Associate members 
In April 2004, the People's Republic of China joined IODP as an Associate Member through sponsorship of China's Ministry of Science and Technology (MOST). China's participation in IODP has given the Chinese marine science community a new impetus and increased their opportunity for deep-sea research. Chinese scientists participated in research expeditions and represent China's interests in the IODP Science Advisory Structure.

South Korea's memorandum of understanding with the lead agencies created the Interim Asian Consortium.

Ministry of Earth Sciences (MoES), Government of India joined the IODP in 2008 as an Associate member. Since then, the National Centre for Antarctic and Ocean Research (NCAOR), Goa has been designated by India to look after all IODP related activities in India (IODP-India). In this direction, an international workshop on IODP drilling in Indian Ocean was organized in Goa during 17–18 October 2011. The workshop was co-hosted by IODP Management International and ANZIC.

Hundreds of international Earth and ocean scientists participated in IODP on a voluntary basis. Participation took many forms: submission of a drilling proposal; sailing on an expedition; participation in an advisory capacity; attendance at a planning workshop or topical symposium. The program's central management office, IODP Management International, coordinated an integrated work plan between and among all IODP organizational partners. An annual program plan was written each fiscal year and included objectives and tasks necessary for drilling vessel operation, from science coordination to publications, data management, and outreach.

Uniquely IODP 
IODP distinguishes itself from its legacy programs by employing multiple drilling technologies/platforms and science/drilling operators to acquire sediment and rock samples and to install monitoring instrumentation beneath the seafloor. Samples and data collected during IODP drilling expeditions are available to scientists and teachers on an open-access basis, once members of the expedition parties have completed their initial studies.

Planning IODP drilling: science advisory structure

Drilling proposal process 
Drilling proposals originated with science proponents, often researchers in geology, geophysics, microbiology, paleontology, or seismology. Once submitted to IODP, the proposal was carefully evaluated by the Science Advisory Structure (SAS), a group of technical review panels. Only those proposals judged as the greatest value based on scientific and technical merit were scheduled for implementation.

SAS panels provided advice on drilling proposals to both proponents and IODP management. Drilling proposals were accepted twice a year, in April and October, and could be submitted to IODP electronically via their website.

The science plan 
A ten-year program plan called the Initial Science Plan (ISP) guided IODP investigation. Specific scientific themes were emphasized in the ISP:
 investigation into the deep biosphere and subseafloor life;
 climate change;
 solid Earth cycles; and
 geodynamics

As described in the ISP, IODP sought to develop better understandings of:
 the earthquake-generating zone beneath convergent continental margins;
 the complex microbial ecosystem that exists beneath the seafloor;
 the nature of gas hydrates that lie beneath continental margins;
 climate history, extreme climates;
 rapid climate change;
 the role of continental break-up in sedimentary basin formation;
 the formation of volcanic rifted margins and oceanic plateaus through time; and
 drilling to Earth's mantle to examine and monitor a complete section of oceanic crust

Tools critical to these goals included a riser-equipped drilling vessel, a riserless vessel, additional platforms suited to mission specific expeditions, enhanced downhole measurement devices, and long-term monitoring instrumentation.

Engineering proposals 
An engineering proposal submission process, initiated in April 2007, facilitated the acquisition of existing or latent technology to be used in IODP operations.

Science and drilling operators 
Drilling operations were conducted and managed by three IODP implementing organizations:
 United States Implementing Organization (USIO) carried out expeditions on the riserless drilling vessel JOIDES Resolution;
 ECORD Science Operator (ESO) managed mission specific expeditions on various platforms;
 Center for Deep Earth Exploration (CDEX) managed operations aboard the riser-equipped drilling vessel Chikyū.

Each drilling expedition was led by a pair of co-chief scientists, with a team of scientists supported by a staff scientist. Each implementing organization provided a combination of services: technical, operational, and financial management; logging; laboratory; core repository; data management; and publication. Although each implementing organization was responsible for its own platform operations and performance, its science operations was funded by the lead agencies.

The operators conducted the following expeditions during the IODP:

Drilling vessels and platforms 

IODP employed two dedicated drilling vessels, each sponsored by a lead agency and managed by their respective implementing organization:

JOIDES Resolution – riserless 

The U.S.-sponsored drilling vessel was operated throughout the Ocean Drilling Program and the first phase of IODP. The vessel then underwent a rebuild, allowing for increased laboratory space; improved drilling, coring, and sampling capacity; and enhanced health, safety, and environmental protection systems on board.

Chikyū – riser-equipped 

Japan began building a state-of-the-art scientific drilling vessel for research in 2001 with the intent of reaching Earth's mantle and drilling into an active seismogenic zone. The resulting drilling vessel, Chikyū (Japanese for "Planet Earth") features a riser drilling system, a dynamic positioning system, and a high-density mud circulation system to prevent borehole collapse during drilling, among other assets. Chikyū was damaged during the tsunami of 11 March 2011, and was out-of-service for several months. Chikyū returned to ocean drilling in April 2012.

Mission-specific platforms 
ECORD commissioned ships on an expedition-by-expedition basis, depending on specific scientific requirements and environment. ECORD contracted the use of three icebreakers for the Arctic Coring Expedition (2004), drilling vessels diving for use in shallow Tahitian (2005) and Australian waters (2010), where scientists sampled fossil coral reefs to investigate the rise in global sea levels since the last ice age, and a liftboat for sampling the New Jersey Shallow Shelf (2009). Mission-specific expeditions required substantial flexibility.

Extending IODP to the science community 
Publications, data management, online tools, and databases are in development to support information- and resource-sharing, so as to expand the ranks of scientists who engage in ocean drilling investigations.

Publication and data management 
IODP publications are freely available online and a data management system integrates core and laboratory data collected by all three implementing organizations and the two IODP legacy programs. A web-based search system will eventually aggregate post-expedition data and related publications. Requests for data and samples can be made online.

Site Survey Data Bank (SSDB) 
A web-based Site Survey Data Bank enabled proponents to access and deposit the large amounts of data required to document potential drill sites for evaluation. This data was reviewed to assure IODP expeditions could meet their objectives and comply with safety and environmental requirements.

Core repositories 
Three IODP core repositories located in Bremen, Germany (IODP Bremen Core Repository), College Station, Texas (IODP Gulf Coast Repository), and Kochi, Japan, archive cores based on geographical origin. Scientists may visit any one of the facilities for onsite research or request a loan for analysis or for teaching purposes. Archived cores include not only IODP samples, but also those retrieved in the two IODP legacy programs (DSDP and ODP).

See also

References

External links
 Integrated Ocean Drilling Program official website
 European Consortium for Ocean Research Drilling official website
 Center for Deep Earth Exploration 
 Ocean Drilling Program Legacy Website
 Learn more about IODP and the U.S. involvement
 An educational view of the Integrated Ocean Drilling Program
 JOI Learning – Education resources and programs associated with the Integrated Ocean Drilling Program

Marine geology
Drilling rig operators